Ana Rosa Payán Cervera is a Mexican right-wing politician from Yucatán who in 2006 served as Director of the National System for Integral Family Development (DIF) in the cabinet of Vicente Fox.  In 2007 she ran for Governor of Yucatán as the Labor Party–Convergence candidate.

Personal life
Payán was born to Alfonso Payán Flores and Aurora Cervera de Payán. She holds a bachelor's degree in accounting.

Political career
Payán joined the National Action Party in 1983 and from that year until early 2007 she was an active PAN member.  She served as federal deputy from 1988 to 1990, representing Yucatán's First District; Mayor of Mérida from 1991 to 1993 (the first female in that function); local deputy in the state of Yucatán from 1995 to 1997; and Senator from 1997 to 2000. In January 2006 President Vicente Fox designated her Director of the Sistema Nacional para el Desarrollo Integral de la Familia (DIF).

Yucatán gubernatorial election
In December 2006 Payán contested for the PAN nomination for Governor of Yucatán but was defeated in the PAN primaries by Xavier Abreu Sierra; following the primary election results Payán left the PAN alleging fraud during the elections; She then accepted the Convergence  invitation to run as its candidate for the 2007 Yucatán gubernatorial election.  Payán lost against the PRI candidate.

References

1952 births
Living people
Politicians from Campeche City
Members of the Chamber of Deputies (Mexico)
Municipal presidents of Mérida
Members of the Senate of the Republic (Mexico)
National Action Party (Mexico) politicians
Citizens' Movement (Mexico) politicians
Women members of the Senate of the Republic (Mexico)
Women mayors of places in Mexico
Women members of the Chamber of Deputies (Mexico)
20th-century Mexican politicians
20th-century Mexican women politicians
21st-century Mexican politicians
21st-century Mexican women politicians